Rui Machado and Daniel Muñoz-de la Nava were the defending champions, but decided not to participate.
Olivier Charroin and Stéphane Robert won the title after defeating Franco Ferreiro and André Sá 6–2, 6–3 in the final.

Seeds

  Dustin Brown /  Adil Shamasdin (first round)
  Franco Ferreiro /  André Sá (final)
  Tomasz Bednarek /  Mateusz Kowalczyk (first round)
  Olivier Charroin /  Stéphane Robert (champions)

Draw

Draw

External Links
 Main Draw

Poznan Porsche Open - Doubles
2011 Doubles

id:Poznań Porsche Open 2011 – Tunggal